The Illipah Formation is a geologic formation in Utah. It preserves fossils dating back to the Carboniferous period.

See also

 List of fossiliferous stratigraphic units in Utah
 Paleontology in Utah

References
 

Carboniferous geology of Utah
Carboniferous southern paleotropical deposits